Anguillara may refer to:

 House of Anguillara, baronial family of Latium 
 Anguillara Sabazia, town and comune in the Metropolitan City of Rome, Lazio
 Anguillara Veneta, municipality in the Province of Padua in the Italian region Veneto